Brian Rowan (28 June 1948 – 22 December 2021) was a Scottish professional footballer who played as a full back. Active in Scotland, England, Canada and the United States, Rowan made nearly 100 appearances in a 7-year career.

Career
Born in Glasgow, Rowan played professionally in Scotland, England, Canada and the United States for Baillieston Juniors, Aston Villa, Toronto Metros, Watford, Morton and the New York Cosmos.

He died on 22 December 2021.

References

1948 births
2021 deaths
Footballers from Glasgow
Scottish footballers
Association football fullbacks
Baillieston Juniors F.C. players
Aston Villa F.C. players
Toronto Blizzard (1971–1984) players
Watford F.C. players
Greenock Morton F.C. players
New York Cosmos players
Scottish Junior Football Association players
English Football League players
North American Soccer League (1968–1984) players
Scottish Football League players
Scottish expatriate footballers
Scottish expatriate sportspeople in Canada
Scottish expatriate sportspeople in the United States
Expatriate soccer players in Canada
Expatriate soccer players in the United States